is a city located in Ishikawa Prefecture, Japan. , the city had an estimated population of 113,375 in 43246 households, and a population density of 290 persons per km2. It is the second-most populous city in Ishikawa Prefecture after Kanazawa.

Geography
Hakusan is located in southwestern Ishikawa Prefecture in the Hokuriku region of Japan and is bordered by the Sea of Japan to the west and Fukui Prefecture to the south, and Gifu Prefecture and Toyama Prefectures to the east. The southeastern portion of the city is dominated by high mountains. Parts of the city are within the borders of Hakusan National Park.

Neighbouring municipalities 
Ishikawa Prefecture
Kanazawa
Komatsu
Nomi
Nonoichi
Kawakita
Fukui Prefecture
Ōno
Katsuyama
Gifu Prefecture
Takayama
Shirakawa (village) 
Toyama Prefecture
Nanto

Climate
Hakusan has a humid continental climate (Köppen Cfa) characterized by mild summers and cold winters with heavy snowfall.  The average annual temperature in Hakusan is 14.2 °C. The average annual rainfall is 2542 mm with September as the wettest month. The temperatures are highest on average in August, at around 26.8 °C, and lowest in January, at around 2.9 °C.

Demographics
Per Japanese census data, the population of Hakusan has recently plateaued after decades of strong growth.

History 
The area around Hakusan was part of ancient Kaga Province. The area became part Kaga Domain under the Edo period Tokugawa shogunate.  Following the Meiji restoration, the area was organised into Ishikawa District, Ishikawa. The town of Mattō was established with the creation of the modern municipalities system on April 1, 1889. It became a city on October 10, 1970. On February 1, 2005, Mattō merged with the towns of Mikawa and Tsurugi, and the villages of Kawachi, Oguchi, Shiramine, Torigoe and Yoshinodani (all from Ishikawa District) to form the city of Hakusan.

Government
Hakusan has a mayor-council form of government with a directly elected mayor and a unicameral city legislature of 21 members.

Economy 
Eizo and its subsidiary, Irem, have their headquarters in Hakusan.

Education
Hakusan has 19 public elementary schools and ten middle schools operated by the city government, and three public high schools operated by the Ishikawa Prefectural Board of Education and one by the city government. There is also one private high school. Kinjo College, a private junior college is also located in Hakusan.

Transportation

Railway
  West Japan Railway Company - Hokuriku Main Line
 Komaiko - Mikawa - Kaga-Kasama - Mattō
 Hokuriku Railroad - Ishikawa Line
  -  -  -  -  -  -

Highway
 Hokuriku Expressway

Sister city relations
  - Fujieda, Shizuoka, Japan
  - Columbia, Missouri, United States
  - Boston, Lincolnshire, United Kingdom
  - Penrith, New South Wales, Australia
  - Liyang, Jiangsu, China
  - Raunheim, Hesse, Germany
  - Beaugency, Loiret, France

Local attractions
 Ishikawa Forest Experiment Station
 Hakusan, the "White Mountain" from which the merged city took its name.
 Hakusan National Park
 Tedori River
 Torigoe Castle ruins, a National Historic Site 
 Matto Stadium is home to the city's major football club, FC Hokuriku (formerly Fervorosa Ishikawa, Fervorosa Hakusan and FC Goals) which competes in the Hokushinetsu Regional League.
 Tedorigawa Yoshida Sake Brewery

References

External links

 Hakusan City official website  
 Hakusan City Tourist Information Guide

 
Cities in Ishikawa Prefecture
Populated coastal places in Japan